Debra Eisenstadt is an American writer, director, producer and editor.

Career
Eisenstadt began her career as an actress, most notably starring in the theater and film versions of David Mamet’s Oleanna opposite William H. Macy. Eisenstadt wrote, produced, directed, shot and edited the feature film Daydream Believer, winner of an Independent Spirit Award and The Grand Jury Prize at the Slamdance Film Festival. Similarly, she helmed three other independent features: the award-winning films The Limbo Room (with Melissa Leo, Peter Dinklage), Before the Sun Explodes, and Blush starring Wendi McLendon-Covey. Eisenstadt has written and directed for Nickelodeon and works as a script doctor and a teacher. She Executive Produced the acclaimed documentaries (directed by Brett Morgen) Moonage Daydream (2022)Kurt Cobain: Montage of Heck and Jane, the award-winning 2017 documentary about Jane Goodall.

Eisenstadt wrote and directed the 2019 film Imaginary Order which premiered at the 2019 Sundance Film Festival''.

Personal life
Eisenstadt is married to director Brett Morgen. She graduated from Bennington College in 1991 and received a master's degree in Film/Media Studies from New School University in 2000.

References

External links

Living people
Place of birth missing (living people)
Year of birth missing (living people)
American film directors
American women film directors
American women screenwriters
21st-century American women